Vivint Smart Home, Inc. is a smart home company in the United States and Canada, and a subsidiary of NRG Energy. It was founded by Keith Nellesen and Todd Pedersen in 1999.

In 2012, The Blackstone Group acquired Vivint for more than $2 billion. In January 2020, the company completed a merger and became a publicly traded company on the New York Stock Exchange.

History 

In 1999, Keith Nellesen and Todd Pedersen co-founded APX Alarm Security Solutions in Provo, Utah. At the time, the company sold and installed security systems. APX Alarm Security Solutions rebranded as Vivint in February 2011. Vivint was acquired by The Blackstone Group in November 2012.

In February 2014, the company donated $1 million to the Utah Valley University, along with a $1 million investment from Vivint's CEO, to establish a professional sales program and a SMART Lab for marketing research.

Vivint's former CEO Todd Pedersen appeared on the CBS television show Undercover Boss in February 2015.

In 2015, Vivint became the official safety sponsor for Autism Speaks.

The 2017 J.D. Power 2017 Home Security Satisfaction Study ranked Vivint as the "Highest in Home Security Customer Satisfaction" among home security brands. The 2020 Home Security Satisfaction Study ranked Vivint second, behind AT&T Digital Life.

In January 2020, Vivint completed a merger with Mosaic Acquisition Corp. and became a publicly traded company on the New York Stock Exchange.

In December 2022, NRG announced the acquisition of Vivint Smart Home for $2.8 billion in cash, adding home security and automation to its offerings, expected to close on the first quarter of 2023.

Vivint Solar
The company launched Vivint Solar, a solar energy company, in 2011. Vivint Solar went public in October 2014 and was later purchased by Sunrun.

Vivint Arena
On October 26, 2015, Vivint acquired the naming rights to the Utah Jazz's home arena, renaming the building as Vivint Arena. The contract lasts for 10 years. In April 2018 Vivint and the Utah Jazz added a new sensory room at the arena for children with autism spectrum disorder.

Products and services 
Vivint offers home security products, including doorbell cameras, smart thermostats, indoor cameras, and integrations with lighting. In 2019, Vivint launched products for car security, and outdoor home security cameras.

In 2017, Vivint announced a partnership with Airbnb to allow hosts to integrate their Airbnb account with Vivint products. In 2018, Vivint collaborated with Google to include two Google Home Mini devices in their starter kits.

Legal issues and deceptive marketing 
Vivint has been the target of many lawsuits for its deceptive marketing and direct sales practices. Vivint has also both sued, and been sued by, ADT Inc. over allegations of patent infringement.

From 2009 through 2014 the company settled lawsuits with the states of Arkansas, Oregon, Ohio, and Nebraska. In 2014, Vivint settled two federal class-action lawsuits for alleged violations of the TCPA.

In 2018, Vivint agreed to a $10 million settlement with ADT after ADT claimed that Vivint agents had fraudulently signed up ADT’s customers to Vivint contracts. According to ADT they received nearly 1,000 complaints by its customers over the practice.

In May 2021, Vivint was fined $20 million for violations of the Fair Credit Reporting Act under Federal Trade Commission Act of 1914. According to regulators, Vivint's sales representatives used the names and identities of people without their knowledge or consent in the place of customers who failed credit checks. Vivint then sold this false debt to debt collectors in violation of the FTC's Red Flags Rule.

In December 2021, Vivint was sued by CPI Security over allegations that Vivint sales representatives used deceptive tactics to acquire CPI's customers, including claiming that Vivint was buying out CPI.

In March 2022, Vivint settled a case with the state of Arizona to pay $325,000 in penalties, and $75,000 in restitution. The Arizona Attorney General's office alleges that Vivint's sales representatives used deceptive marketing practices, including false representations of Vivint services and policies, false claims that the customer's current security company was being bought by Vivint, and non-consensual extensions of contracts.

See also 
List of home automation software
List of private security companies
List of Utah companies

References

External links 

 

Home automation companies
Companies based in Provo, Utah
Security companies of the United States
Technology companies established in 1997
Privately held companies based in Utah
1997 establishments in Utah
The Blackstone Group companies
Smart home hubs
2020 initial public offerings
2012 mergers and acquisitions
2020 mergers and acquisitions
2023 mergers and acquisitions